The Experimental Squadrons also known as Evolutionary Squadrons of the Royal Navy were groups of ships sent out in the 1830s and 1840s to test new techniques of ship design, armament, building and propulsion against old ones.  They came about as a result of conflict between the "empirical" school of shipbuilding (led by William Symonds, Surveyor of the Navy), the "scientific" school led by the first School of Naval Architecture (closed in 1832), and the "traditional" school led by master shipwrights from the royal dockyards.

1831–1832
Admiral Edward Codrington formed a "Squadron of Evolution" for conducting trials on new hull forms. The squadron was formed in 1831 as part of a strategy to sit off the Belgian coast and to encourage a French withdrawal. The French were there to support the Belgians against the Dutch. Later on the ships had to reinforce a British squadron operating in the Tagus, off Lisbon as constitutionalists and absolutist factions waged a civil war ashore.

1832

The Experimental Squadron under command of Sir Pulteney Malcolm held trials in July 1832 off the Irish coast, and again on 14 August off the Scilly Islands.

The trial of 13 July was between HM cutter Emerald (tender to the Victory) and the Paddy from Cork. The Paddy recently lengthened to 99 tons, winning by twelve minutes or nearly one mile.

1844
Determined to prove William Symonds' designs to be failures, the new Tory Board of Admiralty sent out successive "Experimental Squadrons" in the mid-1840s. The ships of the line were joined at Lisbon on 3 November by Symonds' two-decker , and all four arrived back in Portsmouth on 27 November, 9 days before the brig squadron.

1845
The squadron arrived at Cork on 7 September, left on the 18th, and arrived in Plymouth on the 20th. (In this and all the other 1845 squadrons Queen performed well, having performed badly in the 1844 squadron.) In Plymouth, the same squadron was transferred to Rear-Admiral Sir Samuel Pym and sailed on 21 October, returning to the same port on 3 December. The third and final 1845 cruise lasted 43 days and consisted solely of the two deckers from the previous two (Albion, Vanguard, Superb, Rodney and Canopus), accompanied by a brig from the 1844 squadron, . It sailed from Plymouth on 21 October, led, not by an admiral (those then available were all very old and infirm, and the Admiralty placed little confidence in them), but by successive captains in the squadron acting as commodore (Moresby in Canopus, and then Willes in Vanguard).

1846

Results
Outside factors in the 1840s tests, such as individual captains' political bias or stowage's influence on how well a ship sailed, were underappreciated and so in October 1847 - in the face of the Board's institution of  a "Committee of Reference" the previous year to oversee him and modify his designs according to the Board's wishes - Symonds resigned his role.

Commanders

References

Sources
Experimental Squadrons at the William Loney website

External links
 

19th-century history of the Royal Navy
Royal Navy squadrons
Royal Navy
1830s in the United Kingdom
1840s in the United Kingdom